Dania is the [Medieval] Latin name for Denmark (named for the Dani tribe).

Dania may also refer to:

 Dania Academy, usually referred to as Dania, a business academy with eight campuses in Denmark
 Dania Beach, Florida, a city in Broward County
 Dania College, one of the oldest colleges in Bangladesh
 Dania Park, a park in Malmö, Sweden
 Dania Ramirez (born 1979), Dominican-American actress
 Dania transcription, a transcription standard of the Danish language
 Dania, Ivory Coast, a town and sub-prefecture in Sassandra-Marahoué District
 Danial, Mazandaran, a village in Iran

See also
LeDania, Colombian street artist
Dacia (disambiguation)
Danica (disambiguation)
Dhania, an alternative name for coriander
Dania, otherwise known as Sudania